Yu 1001 was an Imperial Japanese Army transport submarine, the lead unit of the Yu 1001 subclass of the Yu I type. Constructed for use during the latter stages of World War II, she served in the waters of the Japanese archipelago until sunk in the final days of the war.

Construction
In the final two years of World War II, the Imperial Japanese Army constructed transport submarines — officially the Type 3 submergence transport vehicle and known to the Japanese Army as the Maru Yu — with which to supply its isolated island garrisons in the Pacific. Only submarines of the Yu I type were completed and saw service. None of the Yu I-type submarines carried torpedoes or had torpedo tubes. Yu 1001 was the lead unit of the Yu 1001 subclass.

Japan Steel Works (Nihon Seikojo) constructed  at its plant in Hiroshima, Japan. She was launched on 27 March 1944 and completed on 15 June 1944.

Service history
Yu 1001 spent her operational career in Japanese home waters. She was assigned to Detachment 2, Transport Submarine Group, in November 1944. In January 1945, several Type I transport submarines were sent to operate from Shimoda on the southern tip of the Izu Peninsula in Shizuoka Prefecture on Honshu, and the submarines began transport missions from Shimoda in March 1945. It is not clear when Yu 7 began operations from Shimoda, but she made a round-trip supply voyage from Shimoda to Hachijō-jima in the Philippine Sea sometime during 1945 as well as a round-trip supply voyage from the Army Transport Submarine Base on the Seto Inland Sea at Mishima in Ehime Prefecture on Shikoku to Ōshima Island in March 1945. U.S. aircraft sank her at Shimoda on 12 August 1945.

References

Footnotes

Bibliography
 

 
Rekishi Gunzō, History of Pacific War Extra, Perfect guide, The submarines of the Imperial Japanese Forces, Gakken, Tokyo Japan, 2005, .
Rekishi Gunzō, History of Pacific War Vol.45, Truth histories of the Imperial Japanese Naval Vessels, Gakken, Tokyo Japan, 2004, .
Ships of the World No.506, Kaijinsha, Tokyo Japan, 1996.
The Maru Special, Japanese Naval Vessels No.43 Japanese Submarines III, Ushio Shobō, Tokyo Japan, 1980.
Atsumi Nakashima, Army Submarine Fleet, "The secret project !, The men challenged the deep sea", Shinjinbutsu Ōraisha, Tokyo Japan, 2006, .
50 year history of the Japan Steel Works (first volume and second volume), Japan Steel Works, 1968.

1944 ships
Ships built in Japan
Submarines of the Imperial Japanese Army
World War II submarines of Japan
Japanese submarines lost during World War II
Maritime incidents in August 1945
Shipwrecks in the Inland Sea